Rogers Field  is a public airport bordering the southwest of the town of Chester, serving Plumas County, California, United States. It has two runways (only one of which is still opened and maintained, however) and is mostly used for general aviation and USFS/CDF access.

In addition to its civil-aviation role it also serves as the Chester Air Attack Base, a logistical and coordination facility owned and managed by Lassen National Forest (LNF), USFS, for the support of the LNF Air Attack 06, Copter 510, California Department of Forestry's aerial firefighting aircraft (both fixed-wing and helicopter) and other air tankers and heli-tankers leased by the USFS.  Resources include fueling, retardant loading for aerial tankers, communications, and some quartering for aircrew, helitack, and ground fire-fighting teams.

Facilities 
Rogers Field has two runways:

 Runway 16/34: 5,000 x 100 ft (1,524 x 30 m), surface: asphalt
 Runway 5/23: 5,320 x 120 ft (1,622 x 37 m), surface: dirt

Runway 5/23 is closed indefinitely and no longer maintained.

References 
 Airport Master Record (FAA Form 5010), also available as a printable form (PDF)

External links

Airports in Plumas County, California